The Czech Republic participated at the 2017 Summer Universiade, in Taipei, Taiwan with 139 competitors in 14 sports.

Competitors
The following table lists the Czech Republic's delegation per sport and gender.

Medal summary

Medal by sports

Archery

Athletics

Track Events

Field Events

Combined Events
Decathlon

Baseball
Group stage

Super Round

Bronze medal game

Basketball

Men's tournament
Group stage

|}

9th-16th place quarterfinal

9th-12th place semifinal

11th place game

Women's tournament
Group stage

|}

Quarterfinal

5th-8th place semifinal

7th place game

Fencing

Golf

Gymnastics

Artistic

Rhythmic

Judo

Roller Sports

Swimming

Men

Women

Table Tennis

Tennis

Volleyball

Men's tournament
Group stage

|}

|}

Quarterfinals

|}

5th–8th place semifinals

|}

7th place match

|}

Women's tournament
Group stage

|}

|}

9th–16th place quarterfinals

|}

9th-12th place semifinals

|}

11th place match

|}

Weightlifting

References

Czech Republic at the Summer Universiade